Nanto is a town and comune in the province of Vicenza, Veneto, northern Italy. As of 2011 its population was of 3,071.

Geography
It is located next the Colli Berici, west of SP247 Provincial Road. It borders with the municipalities of Arcugnano, Castegnero, Montegaldella, Mossano and Rovolon; this one in the Province of Padua.

Nanto counts 10 civil parishes (frazioni): Anzolin, Bosco di Nanto, Ca' Nova, Cazzola, Ponte di Nanto, Priare, Prietta, Sambugaro, Torretta and Vegre. The most populated ones are Ponte (the municipal seat) and Bosco.

Demographics

Personalities
Antonio Bailetti (b. 1937), former professional road bicycle racer
Tiziano Frieri (b. 1944) footballer

Photogallery

References

External links

 Nanto official website
Nanto at Google Maps

Cities and towns in Veneto